Professor Michael Stewart Rees Hutt FRCP, FRCPath (1922–2000)  was a British pathologist.

Hutt was born in Shrewsbury on 1 October 1922, the son of Dorothy Jesse née Peck and Arthur Cyril Hutt, an engineer. He was educated at Eastbourne College, and then at London University, and at St Thomas' Medical School.

He was Professor of Pathology at Makerere University, Kampala, Uganda, from 1962 to 1970.

He returned to the United Kingdom to take up the position of Chair in Geographical Pathology at St Thomas' Hospital Medical School, retiring and becoming Emeritus in 1983.

He served on the Medical Research Council's Tropical Medicine Research Board from 1972 to 1976 and on the Wellcome Trust's Tropical Research Grants Committee from 1981 to 1984.

He was Vice-President of the Royal Society of Tropical Medicine and Hygiene from 1991 to 1993 and was elected an Honorary Fellow by them in 1993.

He died on 29 March 2000.

One of his four children (three daughters and a son) is the Welsh politician Jane Hutt, a former Welsh Minister for Health and Social services.

References

Fuerther reading

External links 

 

1922 births
Place of birth missing
2000 deaths
Place of death missing
British medical researchers